Giannis Skopelitis (Greek: Γιάννης Σκοπελίτης; born 2 March 1978) is a Greek former professional footballer who played as a midfielder.

Career

Portsmouth
Skopelitis joined FA Premier League club Portsmouth on 28 January 2005 from Egaleo FC for a fee of £1 million, as a replacement for Amady Faye, who had been sold to Newcastle United. However, it later transpired that the transfer deal was structured as a year's loan with an initial fee of around £300,000 with the remaining £700,000 being paid if the club desired to keep the player after this period.

Skopelitis made his debut for Pompey as a 73rd-minute substitute for Ricardo Fuller in a 2-1 home win over Middlesbrough. Coincidentally, he had already faced Middlesbrough in 2004-05 when facing them for Egaleo in the UEFA Cup.

Having reached the end of his trial period for Portsmouth at the turn of the new year 2006, Skopelitis had made only a few substitute appearances, failing to impress, and returned to Egaleo.

Greece and Cyprus
Skopelitis has played for Egaleo F.C. and Atromitos F.C. in the Greek Super League.

Skopelitis joined Anorthosis Famagusta FC in the 2007-08 season. He left the Cypriot club due to personal problems and transferred for a year to Atromitos F.C. . In the 2008-09 season Skopelitis transferred back to Anorthosis, and in the same year played with them in the UEFA Champions League group stage, and was made captain.

On 3 July 2013, Skopelitis and Anorthosis decided (for the 3rd time) for a mutual contract termination . On 6 July, Skopelitis returned to Larnaca, signing a one-year contract.

References

External links

1978 births
Living people
Greek expatriate footballers
Premier League players
Portsmouth F.C. players
Anorthosis Famagusta F.C. players
Egaleo F.C. players
Atromitos F.C. players
AEK Larnaca FC players
Nea Salamis Famagusta FC players
Expatriate footballers in Cyprus
Expatriate footballers in England
Super League Greece players
Cypriot First Division players
Association football midfielders
Footballers from Athens
Greek footballers